was a town located in Mikata District, Hyōgo Prefecture, Japan. Onsen is the Japanese word for hot springs and the town is named for Yumura Onsen, the local hot springs.

As of 2003, the town had an estimated population of 7,087 and a density of 51.35 persons per km2. The total area was 138.02 km2.

On October 1, 2005, Onsen, along with the town of Hamasaka (also from Mikata District), was merged to create the town of Shin'onsen.

Dissolved municipalities of Hyōgo Prefecture
Shin'onsen, Hyōgo
Spa towns in Japan